In quantum mechanics, orbital magnetization, Morb, refers to the magnetization induced by orbital motion of charged particles, usually electrons in solids. The term "orbital" distinguishes it from the contribution of spin degrees of freedom, Mspin, to the total magnetization.  A nonzero orbital magnetization requires broken time-reversal symmetry, which can occur spontaneously in ferromagnetic and ferrimagnetic materials, or can be induced in a non-magnetic material by an applied magnetic field.

Definitions

The orbital magnetic moment of a finite system, such as a molecule, is given classically by

where J(r) is the current density at point r. (Here SI units are used; in Gaussian units, the prefactor would be 1/2c instead, where c is the speed of light.)  In a quantum-mechanical context, this can also be written as

where −e and me are the charge and mass of the electron, Ψ is the ground-state wave function, and L is the angular momentum operator.  The total magnetic moment is

where the spin contribution is intrinsically quantum-mechanical and is given by

where gs is the electron spin g-factor, μB is the Bohr magneton, ħ is the reduced Planck constant, and S is the electron spin operator.

The orbital magnetization M is defined as the orbital moment density; i.e., orbital moment per unit volume.  For a crystal of volume V composed of isolated entities (e.g., molecules) labelled by an index j having magnetic moments morb, j, this is

However, real crystals are made up out of atomic or molecular constituents whose charge clouds overlap, so that the above formula cannot be taken as a fundamental definition of orbital magnetization.  Only recently have theoretical developments led to a proper theory of orbital magnetization in crystals, as explained below.

Theory

Difficulties in the definition of orbital magnetization

For a magnetic crystal, it is tempting to try to define

where the limit is taken as the volume V of the system becomes large.  However, because of the factor of r in the integrand, the integral has contributions from surface currents that cannot be neglected, and as a result the above equation does not lead to a bulk definition of orbital magnetization.

Another way to see that there is a difficulty is to try to write down the quantum-mechanical expression for the orbital magnetization in terms of the occupied single-particle Bloch functions  of band n and crystal momentum k:

where p is the momentum operator, L = r × p, and the integral is evaluated over the Brillouin zone (BZ).  However, because the Bloch functions are extended, the matrix element of a quantity containing the r operator is ill-defined, and this formula is actually ill-defined.

Atomic sphere approximation

In practice, orbital magnetization is often computed by decomposing space into non-overlapping spheres centered on atoms (similar in spirit to the muffin-tin approximation), computing the integral of r × J(r) inside each sphere, and summing the contributions.  This approximation neglects the contributions from currents in the interstitial regions between the atomic spheres.  Nevertheless, it is often a good approximation because the orbital currents associated with partially filled d and f shells are typically strongly localized inside these atomic spheres.  It remains, however, an approximate approach.

Modern theory of orbital magnetization

A general and exact formulation of the theory of orbital magnetization was developed in the mid-2000s by several authors, first based on a semiclassical approach, then on a derivation from the Wannier representation, and finally from a long-wavelength expansion. The resulting formula for the orbital magnetization, specialized to zero temperature, is 

where fn k is 0 or 1 respectively as the band energy En k falls above or below the Fermi energy μ,

is the effective Hamiltonian at wavevector k, and 

is the cell-periodic Bloch function satisfying

A generalization to finite temperature is also available. Note that the term involving the band energy En k in this formula is really just an integral of the band energy times the Berry curvature.  Results computed using the above formula have appeared in the literature. A recent review summarizes these developments.

Experiments 

The orbital magnetization of a material can be determined accurately by measuring the gyromagnetic ratio γ, i.e., the ratio between the magnetic dipole moment of a body and its
angular momentum.  The gyromagnetic ratio is related to the spin and orbital magnetization according to

The two main experimental techniques are based either on the Barnett effect or the Einstein–de Haas effect. Experimental data for Fe, Co, Ni, and their alloys have been compiled.

References 

Magnetism
Electromagnetism
Quantum mechanics
Electronic structure methods